Amanat is a 2021 Pakistani television series produced by Samina Humayun Saeed and Sana Shahnawaz under banner of Next Level Entertainment in collaboration with Six Sigma Plus. It features Imran Abbas, Urwa Hocane, Saboor Aly in lead roles and Haroon Shahid, Srha Asghar and Gohar Rasheed in supporting roles. It airs weekly on ARY Digital starting from its premier on 21 September 2021.

Plot 
Zaraar and Zunaira are in love and about to be married. Zaraar's sister Samra and Zunaira's brother Raheel are married and awaiting rukhsati. Zunaira is a spoilt brat and a pampered child. She is spoiled by her family and does not care about anyone but herself. Only Zaraar can handle Zooni's mood swings. Firdous worries about Samra hence keeps Zooni happy.

Mehar is in college and only 2 exams are left. But her uncle doesn't let her go to give exam as he says that being his niece is enough for her. Her auntie insists her uncle but he doesn't oblige in fact arranges his mentally retarded son Qaisar's marriage with Mehar. Her auntie gets Mehar married to her nephew Fawad and make them run. Fawad turns to his college friend Zaraar for help.

Years ago on the way to give their exam, Zaraar hits a kid by mistake with Fawad sitting on the back seat. They take the kid to the hospital. While waiting for the parents of the kid to arrive Fawad asks Zaraar to leave saying he will handle everything. Zaraar feels indebted to him as he saved his career.

Fawad turns up at Zaraar's place which his company allotted to him in Islamabad. Fawad goes to the market to buy credit for his phone number. There some mobile snatchers see him, take his phone and murder him.

Zaraar looks for him but couldn't find him. Next day is his mehendi so he takes Mehar with him to Karachi as he considers her his responsibility now. Zuneira and her family doubts Mehar and his relationship. Meanwhile Zaraar gets to know that Fawad has died. Zaraar's brother Junaid also creates misunderstanding between Zaraar and Meher. On the day of the wedding, Meher's uncle arrives at the venue and tries to take her with him. Zaraar tells him that he is married to Meher. Malik shoots at Meher. Zaraar takes her to the hospital. The guests leave. Zuneira's family says they will not take Samra with them. Junaid comes forward to marry Zuneira. Zuneira agrees to marry Junaid with ulterior motives.

Safdar hears Zaraar and Mehar talk and finally everyone gets to know that they are not married and do not have an affair. Safdar gets them married anyhow. Zuneira keeps on insulting Samra, Mehar, Junaid and Firdous. She manipulates her family and Junaid. Samra is pregnant. She falsely blames Junaid of beating her in front of the entire family. Junaid gets to know her truth. Mehar and Zaraar starts to love each other. Mehar is pregnant. Zuneira befriends her and takes her to her doctor friend and gives her wrong medicines. Junaid gets to know about the wrong medicines and confronts her. Junaid also changes Mehar's medicines. Zuniera creates misunderstanding in the family regarding Junaid and Mehar. She tricks Mehar into going to Junaid's room when everyone including Samr and Raheel are present. Then she creates a scene. Zaraar doesn't trust Mehar. Junaid runs out of the house when no one listens to him. Firdous throws Mehar out of the house. Mehar runs into the doctor and calls her aunt and goes home. Zuneira tries to get Zaraar's sympathy. Junaid stays in a hotel overnight. He runs into a female friend outside and she decides to help him get settled in UK and get a job. Zuneira keeps portraying herself as helpless to gain Zaraar's sympathy. Mehar faints and gets to know about her pregnancy. Raheel asks Junaid to divorce Zuneira, fearing for herself and the baby, Samra faints is taken to the hospital. Saeeda takes Mehar to Zaraar to talk to him but Zuneira doesn't let her meet him and tells her that the baby will be proof that she is characterless. Zuneira finds UK visa and creates a scene.

Cast 

 Imran Abbas as Zaraar Hussain, Male Protagonist. Elder Son of Safdar and Firdous, Brother of Junaid and Samrah, Husband of Mehar.
 Urwa Hocane as Mehar Zaraar, Female Protagonist. Wife of Zaraar, and widowed of Fawad and Niece of Malik Furqan.
 Saboor Aly as Zunaira Abid, Main Antagonist. Spoiled Daughter of Abid and Salma, Sister of Raheel and past love of Zaraar who marries his (Zaraar) brother Junaid to take revenge with Zaraar and Mehar. Divorced from Junaid 
 Haroon Shahid as Junaid Hussain, Side Protagonist. But was Jealous of Zaraar, Younger Son of Safdar and Firdous, Brother of Zaraar and Samrah, EX Husband of Zunera. Now married to Laiba 
 Gohar Rasheed as Malik Khaysar, Mentally disturbed person and only son of Malik Furqan. He wishes to marry Mehar. (Dead)
 Babar Ali as Malik Furqan, A Powerful Landlord, Uncle of Mehar, Father of Malik Khaysar and Husband of Saeeda Begum.
 Saima Qureshi as Saeeda Begum, Wife of Malik Furqan and Aunt of Mehar
 Salman Saeed as Raheel Abid, Son of Salma and Abid, Brother of Zunera and Husband of Samrah.
 Srha Asgar as Samrah, Sister of Zaraar and Junaid, Daughter of Safdar and Firdous, wife of Raheel
 Shehryar Zaidi as Safdar Hussain, Father of Zaraar, Junaid and Samrah.
 Saba Hameed as Firdous, Mother of Zaraar, Junaid and Samrah.
 Tara Mahmood as Salma, Mother of Zunera and Raheel. Wife of Abid
 Asad Siddiqui as Fawad (Cameo) Dead &  Mehar Husband 
 Raja Haider as Abid, Father of Zunera and Raheel. Husband of Salma. Dead
 Faiza Khan as Laiba Junaid, 2nd Wife of Junaid & Daughter in law of Firdous and Safdar.
Faysal Shahzad as Allah Bakhsh (Malik Furqan Loyal servant).

Production 
In October 2020, producers Samina Humayun Saeed and Sana Shahnawaz revealed the cast and other details of their upcoming project. The serial is directed by Shahid Shafat and written by Rukhsana Nigar, made their second collaboration after Lamha Lamha Zindagi (2010).

References

External links
 

ARY Digital original programming
2021 Pakistani television series debuts
Pakistani drama television series
Urdu-language television shows